Nyūgawa Station is the name of two train stations in Japan:

 Nyūgawa Station (Ehime) (壬生川駅)
 Nyūgawa Station (Mie) (丹生川駅)